József János Váradi (born 21 September 1965) is a Hungarian businessman, who co-founded Wizz Air and has served as its chief executive officer (CEO) since 2003.

Early life
Váradi was born in Debrecen, Hungary in 1965. His father took part in the 1956 Hungarian Revolution, so he had to go to jail and after it maintained his family for occasional work.

Váradi moved to Budapest when 18 and earned a degree in economics from Budapest University of Economic Sciences in 1989. He completed an LLM from the University of London in 2014.

Career to the top of MALÉV 
After a "detour" at Tiszai Vegyi Kombinát and then at the Dutch paint company AkzoNobel, he joined the American consumer goods multinational Procter & Gamble in 1991, where he started as a sales representative and ended up as the sales director responsible for Central and Eastern Europe.

From 1999 he served as CEO of the struggling Hungarian state-owned airline Malév Hungarian Airlines. In 2001, the government helped Malév's losses with HUF9.2 billion (32.8 million). Váradi left the company in March 2003.

Founding, soaring, surviving

Establishment and development 
Váradi was removed from office by the Medgyessy government in 2003, and later that year founded Wizz Air, the largest low-cost airline in Central and Eastern Europe, with five businessmen. Since the founding of Wizz Air, as its chief executive officer (CEO), Váradi's life has been completely intertwined with that of the airline.

With the low-cost carrier, he cut Malév's domestic market share by more than a third. Wizz Air is headquartered in Budapest, based in Geneva. In 2018, it was the largest airline in Central and Eastern Europe, carrying over 34 million passengers per year. It had a fleet of 105 aircraft.

Wizz Air entered the Austrian market in 2018. Váradi told Italian daily newspaper La Republica on 23 January 2018, that he was interested in Italy's struggling carrier Alitalia, but only regarding short and medium-haul routes.

Váradi launched a United Kingdom subsidiary of Wizz Air as part of Brexit contingency plans and met with UK Prime Minister Theresa May to discuss aviation concerns regarding the Brexit. In November 2019, Váradi said that BREXIT would not have a significant impact on aviation, with London remaining the largest air travel market in the world.

In the second half of 2019, environmental protection concerns about the flight, embodied in the "flight shame" movement, have been dismissed by Váradi as saying that Wizz Air is the greenest airline. This is based on the per-passenger emission level, adding that it will reduce emissions per capita by an additional 30 percent by 2030. At the same time, he has condemned inefficiency airlines -such as Lufthansa- offering business class and use outdated technologies, which cause far more specific environmental damage than Wizz Air.

Pandemic and survival 
By early 2020, the first wave of the COVID-19 pandemic had gradually made aviation impossible in Europe. Váradi was forced to reduce their staff by one-fifth,  although Wizz Air's traffic fell relatively the least in Europe, and in April 2020 it was the continent's best-performing discount airline in terms of passenger numbers.  In addition, following Váradi's several ministerial talks, they became a strategic partner of the Hungarian government, and an air bridge was established between Hungary and China to transport health protection equipment procured. The Hungarian Foreign Minister personally thanked Váradi for the "fantastic performance".  In addition, many Hungarian citizens, unable to return home due to lack of available means of transport, were provided with the opportunity to return home by Wizz Air. Wizzair ultimately carried 16.6 million passengers in 2020, which was only 42 percent of the 40 million passengers in the previous year. At the same time, competitor Ryanair only had 34 percent of the 2019 traffic. Wizzair, however, again moved ahead, opening 260 new routes and 13 bases, one of them at London's second largest airport, Gatwick.

In the spring of 2021, when the third wave of the coronavirus epidemic arrived, Váradi called their airline one of the "rare rays of hope" for investors. He stated that he is confident in the recovery of aviation by 2024-2025 and therefore, as the only airline, they will not stop investing, which they can also afford because they have the highest liquidity in the field of air transportation. Their investments are in fleet development and the construction of airports, the first of which will be opened in Brasov.

Recovery 
In April 2021, they also started flights from Wizz Air's Abu Dhabi base, which connects the UAE and surrounding Arab countries with Europe. According to Váradi, overall traffic will reach last year's levels by the summer.

By July 2021 they had indeed reached their 2019 capacity, by which time they were talking about increasing their fleet of 140 aircraft to 500 by the end of the decade. At the same time, Wizz Air made a bonus offer of £100 million (around 42 billion forints) to Váradi, which would be paid if the company's share value could be increased from the current level of around £45 to £120 within five years. The bonus is also conditional on achieving a compound annual growth rate of 20%. If the growth rate is only between 10 and 20 per cent, the CEO could receive a bonus of between £20 million and £100 million. Following the news, influential investor organisations in London financial circles such as Institutional Shareholder Services and Glass Lewis warned Wizz Air investors against accepting the proposal, while the Investors' Association issued a red alert on the matter. However, Bill Franke, chairman of Wizz Air's board and its largest investor, defended their bid plan, saying Váradi is the best CEO in the airline industry and should be motivated to stay with the company. Therefore, they have no problem with paying the bonus if appropriate. 

In August 2021, Váradi announced that 4,600 new pilots would be recruited by 2030, with a first tranche of almost 500 pilots trained and recruited by the end of 2021.

Awards
 Váradi was named CEO of the Year in Central and Eastern Europe in 2018. 
 He was awarded with the CAPA Aviation Executive Of The Year Award even in 2018.
 In 2018, Váradi represented Hungary in the "EY World Entrepreneur of the Year" competition in Monte Carlo.

Other positions
Váradi is one of the board of directors at Wizz Air Holdings Plc. and Wizz Air Hungary Airlines Ltd. Previously he was employed as a commissioner by PT Mandela Airlines, a member of the supervisory board at Lufthansa Technik Budapest Kft, a chief executive officer at Malév Hungarian Airlines Zrt and a sales director in charge of global customers at Procter & Gamble Ltd.

Family 
Married to Kinga Bóta (1977), world champion and Olympic silver medalist in kayaking; Secretary General of the Budapest Olympic Movement for the Hungarian Sport Foundation (BOM).

References

1965 births
Living people
Corvinus University of Budapest alumni
Alumni of University of London Worldwide
Alumni of the University of London
Chief executives in the airline industry
Hungarian chief executives
Hungarian billionaires
Hungarian economists
People from Debrecen
Airline articles by quality